The Son is a 2019 Argentine Spanish-language psychological thriller film directed by Sebastián Schindel and based on the 2013 novel Una madre protectora (English: A Protective Mother) by Guillermo Martínez with the adapted screenplay written by Leonel D’Agostino. The film was released in theaters on May 2, 2019. On July 26, 2019, the film was available to stream on Netflix in various countries.

Synopsis
The film follows the story of an artist and father, who increasingly becomes paranoid at his wife's actions during her pregnancy. As they attempt to navigate through their personal issues, a child birth occurs, pushing the couple towards a path of twisted motives and deadly consequences.

Cast 
 Joaquín Furriel as Lorenzo Roy
 Martina Gusman as Julieta
 Luciano Cáceres as Renato
 Heidi Toini as Sigrid
 Regina Lamm as Gudrunn

Release
The film was released on May 2, 2019. The film was available to stream in various countries outside of China, South Korea, Argentina and Uruguay on July 26, 2019, by Netflix.

Reception
The film has received favorable reviews from critics. On Rotten Tomatoes, the film has an approval rating of 82% based on 11 reviews with a weighted average of 6.21/10. The website's critics consensus reads: "In the deeply disturbing and suspenseful The Son, director Sebastian Schindel successfully portrays the horrors of paternity, carried by Joaquín Furriel's terrific performance." Jonathan Holland from The Hollywood Reporter mentioned in a positive review of the film, "Disturbing in the best sense of the word, though sometimes let down by attention to detail, the pic deserves at the least to be adopted by horror fests." Carlos Aguilar from Los Angeles Times praised the film, stating that it "maintains a determined stance not to show more than needed to keep one guessing, even if the symbolic references it tries to make and the social statements it may be carrying are left inconclusive."

See also
The Crimes That Bind (2020 film)

References

External links 
 

2019 films
2019 psychological thriller films
Argentine psychological thriller films
2010s Spanish-language films
2010s Argentine films